Thomas Newburgh (–1779) was an Irish poet.

He was the eldest son of Brockhill Newburgh, chairman of the board of linen manufacturers, who owned estates and property at Ballyhaise, co. Cavan. Amongst his works was a miscellaneous collection, Essays, Poetical, Moral, &c., 1769, sometimes appearing in bibliographic records as the work of his father. Newburgh attended Oxford University, but returned to Ireland when he inherited the family estate. Newburgh's poetry included descriptions of buildings and monuments, unusual for the period, such as the lines on a walk at St Stephen's Green.

References

Irish poets
1690s births
1779 deaths
People from County Cavan
Alumni of the University of Oxford